FK Čadca is a Slovak football team, based in the town of Čadca. The club was founded in 1921.

External links 
Official website 
profile

References

Football clubs in Slovakia
Association football clubs established in 1921
1921 establishments in Slovakia